Libby Island Light is a lighthouse on Libby Island, marking the mouth of Machias Bay, in Machiasport, Maine.  The light station was established in 1817 and is an active aid to navigation; the present granite tower was built in 1823 and improved in 1848.  Libby Island Light was listed on the National Register of Historic Places as Libby Island Light Station on June 18, 1976.

Description and history
Libby Island Light is located on South Libby Island, one of two islands (collectively known as the Libby Islands) marking the southernmost approach to Machias Bay on the northeastern coast of Maine.  The light station's principal feature is the lighthouse, an unpainted conical granite tower  in height, with its base  in diameter and its upper parapet  in diameter.  The tower is located on the southern shore of the island, with a fog signal house to its west.  A boat landing is located on the northern shore of the island, and a small helipad is near its center.

The light station was authorized in 1817, and its first tower was a wood-frame structure that was blown down about 1822.  The present tower was built in 1823, and a keeper's house added the following year.  A fourth-order Fresnel lens was installed in the tower in 1855, and a fog signal and several outbuildings (like the keeper's house since demolished) were built the following year.  The present fog signal house was built in 1884.  The light was automated in 1974, and converted to solar power in 2000.  The tower is now the property of the United States Fish and Wildlife Service, and is not open to the public.

See also
National Register of Historic Places listings in Washington County, Maine

Archives and records
Libby Island, Maine Lighthouse Receipt Book at Baker Library Special Collections, Harvard Business School.

References

Lighthouses completed in 1823
Lighthouses on the National Register of Historic Places in Maine
Lighthouses in Washington County, Maine
National Register of Historic Places in Washington County, Maine
1823 establishments in Maine